Mohamed Ayman El Baaly (born June 10, 1993) is an Egyptian professional footballer who currently plays as a centre-back for the Egyptian club El Raja SC.

References

1993 births
Living people
El Raja SC players
Egyptian footballers
Association football defenders
Ghazl El Mahalla SC players
Ismaily SC players
Egyptian Premier League players